Commonwealth is a town in Florence County, Wisconsin, United States. The population was 419 at the 2000 census. The unincorporated community of Commonwealth is located in the town.

Geography
According to the United States Census Bureau, the town has a total area of 42.9 square miles (111.2 km2), of which, 42.3 square miles (109.6 km2) of it is land and 0.6 square miles (1.6 km2) of it (1.42%) is water.

Demographics
As of the census of 2000, there were 419 people, 170 households, and 124 families residing in the town.  The population density was 9.9 people per square mile (3.8/km2). There were 326 housing units at an average density of 7.7 per square mile (3.0/km2). The racial makeup of the town was 98.57% White, and 1.43% from two or more races.

There were 170 households, out of which 31.8% had children under the age of 18 living with them, 64.1% were married couples living together, 7.6% had a female householder with no husband present, and 26.5% were non-families. 21.8% of all households were made up of individuals, and 8.2% had someone living alone who was 65 years of age or older. The average household size was 2.46 and the average family size was 2.89.

In the town, the population was spread out, with 23.9% under the age of 18, 6.4% from 18 to 24, 29.8% from 25 to 44, 24.6% from 45 to 64, and 15.3% who were 65 years of age or older. The median age was 40 years. For every 100 females, there were 105.4 males. For every 100 females age 18 and over, there were 105.8 males.

The median income for a household in the town was $38,015, and the median income for a family was $39,659. Males had a median income of $31,250 versus $23,571 for females. The per capita income for the town was $19,137. About 5.4% of families and 6.4% of the population were below the poverty line, including 8.0% of those under age 18 and 8.8% of those age 65 or over.

References

Towns in Florence County, Wisconsin
Iron Mountain micropolitan area
Towns in Wisconsin